Dolopomyrmex is a genus of ants in the subfamily Myrmicinae containing the single species Dolopomyrmex pilatus.

Distribution and habitat
The genus is known from the western and the southwestern United States, where the ants live in arid desert habitats, likely with an almost exclusively subterranean life style.

Etymology
The genus name is derived from ancient Greek dolops, dolopos ("lurker in ambush") + Greek myrmex, myrmekos ("ant"); the specific name of the type species (D. pilatus) is derived from the pilum (a javelin commonly used by the Roman army), making Dolopomyrmex pilatus the "spear-bearing ambush ant".

References

External links

Myrmicinae
Monotypic ant genera
Hymenoptera of North America